CathWest Innovation College (1993- 2019), or commonly Loyola, was an independent Roman Catholic comprehensive co-educational secondary day school for students in Year Eleven and Year Twelve, located in Mount Druitt, a  western suburb of Sydney, New South Wales, Australia. An Ignatian school in the tradition of  Saint Ignatius of Loyola, the school was founded in 1993 and is a current member of the Christ Catholic College Community of Schools, linked to the international network of Jesuit schools begun in Messina, Sicily in 1548. The school is administered through the Catholic Education Office of the Diocese of Parramatta.

Loyola Senior High School closed at the conclusion of the 2019 Higher School Certificate year and the site was incorporated into CathWest Innovation College and is known as CathWest Innovation College - Loyola Campus 

The  lightly wooded and landscaped site  received the Sulman Award from the Royal Australian Institute of Architects for its design.

Overview 
Loyola Senior High School aims to teach students so that they may become young men and women of competence, conscience and compassion, striving always for excellence in all they do. Jesuit education insists in individual care and concern for each student. Loyola has developed an academic program and pastoral care system, which enables each student to reach his full potential as a person of faith, created and loved by God.

Notable alumni

 Alai Ahio - comedian
 Nas Campanella - news reader, Triple J Radio
 Kylie Gauci - current member of the Australian Gliders wheelchair basketball team
 Mile Jedinak - Former captain of the Australian Soccer Team, the Socceroos.
 Jano Toussounian - Australian actor

See also 

 List of Catholic schools in New South Wales
 Catholic Education, Diocese of Parramatta
 Catholic education in Australia

External links
Diocese: Loyola Senior High School page

Roman Catholic Diocese of Parramatta
Catholic secondary schools in Sydney
Educational institutions established in 1993
Mount Druitt
1993 establishments in Australia